Jakkalskuil is a village in the Mogalakwena Local Municipality of the Waterberg District Municipality of the Limpopo province in South Africa. The village is regarded as one of the villages that are situated in Bakenberg South of Mokopane. The village  divided in three regions, Mookamedi which is named after Mookamedi Secondary School, Xawela where Sekanekamoyi Primary School and Jakkalskuil clinic are located, and  Treseng.

Course
Jakkalskuil community source water direct from one of the main watercourses, Mogalakwena River, in Limpopo, South Africa.

Healthcare
 Jakkalskuil Clinic

Schools

Primary
Sekanekamoyi Primary school.

Secondary
 Mookamedi Secondary School

References

Populated places in the Mogalakwena Local Municipality